Bryan Christopher Chahuaylla Ccorimanya (born 28 October 2000) is a Peruvian footballer who plays as a midfielder.

Club career

Real Garcilaso / Cusco
Chahuaylla played for Cienciano as a youth player and later joined Real Garcilaso. He got his official debut for the club at the age of 18 on 18 May 2019 against Ayacucho FC in the Peruvian Primera División. Chahuaylla played from the first minute, before he was replaced by Reimond Manco after 71 minutes.

Real Garcilaso changed name to Cusco FC for the 2020 season, the season, where Chahuaylla also was promoted permanently to the first team squad. He left the club at the end of 2020, as he wasn't a part of the first team squad for 2021.

References

External links
 
 

Living people
2000 births
Association football midfielders
Peruvian footballers
Peruvian Primera División players
Cienciano footballers
Real Garcilaso footballers
Cusco FC footballers
People from Cusco